Patrick Segi (born Auckland, 21 September 1980) is a New Zealand-born Samoan former rugby union player. He played as a flanker.

Career
His first cap was against Tonga, at Apia, on 2 June 2001 and his last cap was against Tonga, at Apia, on 28 June 2002.
He also was part of the 2003 Rugby World Cup roster, but he never played any match. He also played for Counties Manukau in the National Provincial Championship.

Notes

External links

Patrick Segi on New Zealand Rugby History

1980 births
Living people
Samoan rugby union players
New Zealand sportspeople of Samoan descent
Rugby union players from Auckland
Rugby union flankers
Samoa international rugby union players